Burkholderia seminalis is a gram-negative, aerobic, non-spore-forming, bacterium from the genus Burkholderia and the family Burkholderiaceae which belongs to the Burkholderia cepacia complex.

References

External links
Type strain of Burkholderia seminalis at BacDive -  the Bacterial Diversity Metadatabase

Burkholderiaceae
Bacteria described in 2008